The 2002 Eastern Creek V8 Supercar round was the third round of the 2002 V8 Supercar Championship Series. It was held on the weekend of 26 to 28 April at the Phillip Island Grand Prix Circuit in Victoria, Australia.

The round was dominated by Mark Skaife, who took pole position and won every race of the weekend. These results helped further cement his lead in the championship. Marcos Ambrose was second for the round whilst the podium was rounded out by Craig Lowndes.

Race results

Pre-qualifying 
In a tense pre-qualifying session, several key drivers failed to qualify for the event. Paul Morris and Steve Owen collided, resulting in a puncture for the former toward the end of the session. He was unable to improve on his time and thus became one of the casualties. It was also said to be the first time Wayne Gardner failed to qualify for a motor race. Despite rule changes introduced the round prior in an attempt to aid those who had to undertake pre-qualifying, the system was still universally unpopular with the teams and drivers.

Qualifying 
Friday afternoon's qualifying session provided a few surprises. Brazilian Max Wilson clocked the second-fastest time in just his third weekend in the category. Series veteran John Faulkner stunned the paddock by qualifying in fourth place after years of struggling with budget and equipment. Lowndes qualified outside the top 10 whilst the Dick Johnson Racing Falcon's struggled, with their inexplicable lack of pace leaving them in the mid-pack as they attempted to find a solution. Skaife meanwhile set the benchmark, with a time nearly half a second faster than the rest of the pack, to take provisional pole position.

Top Ten Shootout

Race 1

Race 2

Race 3

References

Eastern Creek
Motorsport in Sydney